Mangini was one of six s built for the French Navy during the 1910s. The ship was condemned in 1934.

Design and description
The Bisson class were enlarged versions of the preceding  built to a more standardized design. Designed to displace , they displaced  at normal load. Their crew numbered 80–83 men.

Mangini was powered by a pair of Zoelly steam turbines, each driving one propeller shaft using steam provided by four Indret water-tube boilers.

The primary armament of the Bisson-class ships consisted of two  Modèle 1893 guns in single mounts, one each fore and aft of the superstructure, and four  Modèle 1902 guns distributed amidships. They were also fitted with two twin mounts for  torpedo tubes amidships.

Construction and career

Mangini was ordered from Schneider et Cie and was launched from its Chalon-sur-Saône shipyard on 31 March 1913. The ship was completed the following year.

On 18 April 1918, she rammed and sank destroyer  in the Strait of Otranto after her steering broke down.

Notes

References

Bibliography

 

Bisson-class destroyers
Ships built in France
1913 ships